

Denmark
Danish West Indies – Baltharzar Frederik Mühlenfels, Governor-General of the Danish West Indies (1802–1807) 
Iceland – 
Ólafur Stefánsson, Governor of Iceland (1790–1806)
Fredrik Christopher, Governor of Iceland (1806–1809)
North Greenland – Peter Hanning Motzfeldt, Inspector of North Greenland (1803–1817)
South Greenland – Marcus Nissen Myhlenphort, Inspector of South Greenland (1802–1821)

France
French Guiana – Jean Baptiste Victor Hugues, Governor of French Guiana (1800–1808)
Guadeloupe – Jean Augustin Ernouf, Captain-General of Guadeloupe (1803–1810)
Martinique – Louis Thomas Villaret de Joyeuse, Governor of Martinique (1802–1809)

Netherlands
Aruba – Occupied by British (1805–1816)
Dutch Guiana – Occupied by British (1804–1816)

Ottoman Empire
 Principality of Abkhazia – 
 Kelesh Begi (1789–1806)
 Arslan Begi (1806–1810)

Portugal
 Angola – 
 Fernão António de Noronha, Governor of Angola (1802–1806)
 Temporarily vacant (1806–1807)
Brazil – 
Fernando José de Portugal e Castro, Viceroy of Brazil (1801–1806)
Marcos de Noronha e Brito, Viceroy of Brazil (1806–1808)
 Macau –
 Caetano de Sousa Pereira, Governor of Macau (1803–1806)
 Bernardo Aleixo de Lemos e Faria, Governor of Macau (1806–1808)

Spanish Empire
Viceroyalty of New Granada – Antonio José Amar y Borbón, Viceroy of New Granada (1803–1810)
Viceroyalty of New Spain – José de Iturrigaray y Aréstegui, Viceroy of New Spain (1803–1808)
Captaincy General of Cuba – Salvador de Muro y Salazar, Governor of Cuba (1799–1812)
Spanish East Indies – 
 Rafael María de Aguilar y Ponce de León, Governor-General of the Philippines (1793–1806)
 Mariano Fernández de Folgueras, Governor-General of the Philippines (1806–1810)
Commandancy General of the Provincias Internas – Nemesio Salcedo y Salcedo (1802–1813)
Viceroyalty of Peru –
 Gabriel de Avilés y del Fierro, Viceroy of Perú (1801–1806)
 José Fernando de Abascal y Sousa, Viceroy of Perú (1806–1816)
Captaincy General of Chile – Luis Muñoz de Guzmán, Royal Governor of Chile (1802–1808)
Viceroyalty of the Río de la Plata – Rafael de Sobremonte, Viceroy of the Río de la Plata (1804–1807)

United Kingdom of Great Britain and Ireland|United Kingdom
 Cayman Islands – William Bodden, Chief Magistrate of the Cayman Islands (1776–1823)
 Malta Protectorate – Alexander Ball, Civil Commissioner of Malta (1802–1809)
 New South Wales – 
Philip Gidley King, Governor of New South Wales (1800–1806)
William Bligh, Governor of New South Wales (1806–1808)
Canada – Robert Prescott, Governor-in-Chief of the Canadas, New Brunswick, and Nova Scotia (1796–1814)
Cape Breton Island – John Despard, Lieutenant Governor of Cape Breton Island (1800–1807)
Colony of Newfoundland – Sir Erasmus Gower, Commodore-Governor of Newfoundland (1804–1806)
Prince Edward Island – Joseph Frederick Wallet DesBarres, Governor of Prince Edward Island, (1804–1812)

Colonial governors
Colonial governors
1806